Philanthropy is a form of altruism that consists of "private initiatives, for the public good, focusing on quality of life". Philanthropy contrasts with business initiatives, which are private initiatives for private good, focusing on material gain; and with government endeavors, which are public initiatives for public good, notably focusing on provision of public services. A person who practices philanthropy is a philanthropist.

Etymology

The word philanthropy comes , from phil- "love, fond of" and anthrōpos "humankind, mankind". In the second century AD, Plutarch used the Greek concept of philanthrôpía to describe superior human beings. During the Middle Ages, philanthrôpía was superseded in Europe by the Christian virtue of charity (Latin: caritas); selfless love, valued for salvation and escape from purgatory. Thomas Aquinas held that "the habit of charity extends not only to the love of God, but also to the love of our neighbor".

Philanthropy was modernized by Sir Francis Bacon in the 1600s, who is credited in great part with preventing the word from being owned by horticulture. Bacon considered philanthrôpía to be synonymous with "goodness",  correlated with the Aristotelian conception of virtue, as consciously instilled habits of good behaviour. Samuel Johnson simply defined philanthropy as "love of mankind; good nature". This definition still survives today and is often cited more gender-neutrally as the "love of humanity."

Europe

Great Britain 

In London, prior to the 18th century, parochial and civic charities were typically established by bequests and operated by local church parishes (such as St Dionis Backchurch) or guilds (such as the Carpenters' Company). During the 18th century, however, "a more activist and explicitly Protestant tradition of direct charitable engagement during life" took hold, exemplified by the creation of the Society for the Promotion of Christian Knowledge and Societies for the Reformation of Manners.

In 1739,  Thomas Coram, appalled by the number of abandoned children living on the streets of London, received a royal charter to establish the Foundling Hospital to look after these unwanted orphans in Lamb's Conduit Fields, Bloomsbury. This was "the first children's charity in the country, and one that 'set the pattern for incorporated associational charities' in general." The hospital "marked the first great milestone in the creation of these new-style charities."

Jonas Hanway, another notable philanthropist of the era, established The Marine Society in 1756 as the first seafarer's charity, in a bid to aid the recruitment of men to the navy. By 1763, the society had recruited over 10,000 men and it was incorporated in 1772. Hanway was also instrumental in establishing the Magdalen Hospital to rehabilitate prostitutes. These organizations were funded by subscription and run as voluntary associations. They raised public awareness of their activities through the emerging popular press and were generally held in high social regard—some charities received state recognition in the form of the Royal Charter.

19th century

Philanthropists, such as anti-slavery campaigner William Wilberforce, began to adopt active campaigning roles, where they would champion a cause and lobby the government for legislative change. This included organized campaigns against the ill treatment of animals and children and the campaign that succeeded in ending the slave trade throughout the Empire starting in 1807.  Although there were no slaves allowed in Britain itself, many rich men owned sugar plantations in the West Indies, and resisted the movement to buy them out until it finally succeeded in 1833.

Financial donations to organized charities became fashionable among the middle-class in the 19th century.  By 1869 there were over 200 London charities with an annual income, all together, of about £2 million. By 1885, rapid growth had produced over 1000 London charities, with an income of about £4.5 million.  They included a wide range of religious and secular goals, with the American import, YMCA, as one of the largest, and many small ones such as the Metropolitan Drinking Fountain Association.  In addition to making annual donations, increasingly wealthy industrialists and financiers left generous sums in their wills.  A sample of 466 wills in the 1890s revealed a total wealth of £76 million, of which £20 million was bequeathed to charities.  By 1900 London charities enjoyed an annual income of about £8.5 million.

Led by the energetic Lord Shaftesbury (1801–1885), philanthropists organized themselves. In 1869 they set up the Charity Organisation Society. It was a federation of district committees, one in each of the 42 Poor Law divisions.  Its central office had experts in coordination and guidance, thereby maximizing the impact of charitable giving to the poor.  Many of the charities were designed to alleviate the harsh living conditions in the slums. such as the Labourer's Friend Society founded in 1830.  This included the promotion of allotment of land to labourers for "cottage husbandry" that later became the allotment movement, and in 1844 it became the first Model Dwellings Company—an organization that sought to improve the housing conditions of the working classes by building new homes for them, while at the same time receiving a competitive rate of return on any investment. This was one of the first housing associations, a philanthropic endeavor that flourished in the second half of the nineteenth century, brought about by the growth of the middle class. Later associations included the Peabody Trust, and the Guinness Trust. The principle of philanthropic intention with capitalist return was given the label "five per cent philanthropy."

Switzerland

In 1863, the Swiss businessman Henry Dunant used his fortune to fund the Geneva Society for Public Welfare, which became the International Committee of the Red Cross.  During the Franco-Prussian War of 1870, Dunant personally led Red Cross delegations that treated soldiers. He shared the first Nobel Peace Prize for this work in 1901.

The French Red Cross played a minor role in the war with Germany (1870–71). After that, it became a major factor in shaping French civil society as a non-religious humanitarian organization.  It was closely tied to the army's Service de Santé.  By 1914 it operated  one thousand local committees with 164,000 members, 21,500 trained nurses, and over 27 million francs in assets.

The International Committee of the Red Cross (ICRC) played a major role in working with POW's on all sides in World War II.  It was in a cash-starved position when the war began in 1939, but quickly mobilized its national offices set up a Central Prisoner of War Agency. For example, it provided food, mail and assistance to 365,000 British and Commonwealth soldiers and civilians held captive.  Suspicions, especially by London, of ICRC as too tolerant or even complicit with Nazi Germany led to its side-lining in favour of the UN Relief and Rehabilitation Administration (UNRRA) as the primary humanitarian agency after 1945.

France

In France, the Pasteur Institute had a monopoly of specialized microbiological knowledge allowed it to raise money for serum production from both private and public sources, walking the line between a commercial pharmaceutical venture and a philanthropic enterprise.

By 1933, at the depth of the Great Depression, the French wanted a welfare state to relieve distress but did not want new taxes. War veterans came up with a solution: the new national lottery proved highly popular to gamblers, while generating  the cash needed without raising taxes.

American money proved invaluable. The Rockefeller Foundation opened an office in Paris and helped design and fund France's modern public health system, under the National Institute of Hygiene. It also set up schools to train physicians and nurses.

Germany
The history of modern philanthropy on the European Continent is especially important in the case of Germany, which became a model for others, especially regarding the welfare state. The princes and in the various imperial states continued traditional efforts, such as monumental buildings, parks and art collections. Starting in the early 19th century, the rapidly emerging middle classes made local philanthropy a major endeavor to establish their legitimate role in shaping society, in contradistinction to the aristocracy and the military. They concentrated on support for social welfare institutions, higher education, and cultural institutions, as well as some efforts to alleviate the hardships of rapid industrialization. The bourgeoisie (upper-middle-class) was defeated in its effort to it gain political control in 1848, but it still had enough money and organizational skills that could be employed through philanthropic agencies to provide an alternative powerbase for its world view.

Religion was a divisive element in Germany, as the Protestants, Catholics and Jews used alternative philanthropic strategies. The Catholics, for example, continued their medieval practice of using financial donations in their wills to lighten their punishment in purgatory after death. The Protestants did not believe in purgatory, but made a strong commitment to the improvement of their communities there and then. Conservative Protestants raised concerns about deviant sexuality, alcoholism and socialism, as well as illegitimate births. They used philanthropy to try to eradicate what they considered as "social evils" that were seen as utterly sinful. All the religious groups used financial endowments, which multiplied in the number and wealth as Germany grew richer. Each was devoted to a specific benefit to that religious community, and each had a board of trustees; these were laymen who donated their time to public service.

Chancellor Otto von Bismarck, an upper class Junker, used his state-sponsored philanthropy, in the form of his invention of the modern welfare state, to neutralize the political threat posed by the socialistic labor unions. The middle classes, however, made the most use of the new welfare state, in terms of heavy use of museums, gymnasiums (high schools), universities, scholarships, and hospitals. For example, state funding for universities and gymnasiums covered only a fraction of the cost; private philanthropy became the essential ingredient. 19th-century Germany was even more oriented toward civic improvement than Britain or the United States, when measured in terms of voluntary private funding for public purposes. Indeed, such German institutions as the kindergarten, the research university, and the welfare state became models copied by the Anglo-Saxons.

The heavy human and economic losses of the First World War, the financial crises of the 1920s, as well as the Nazi regime and other devastation by 1945, seriously undermined and weakened the opportunities for widespread philanthropy in Germany. The civil society so elaborately build up in the 19th century was practically dead by 1945. However, by the 1950s, as the "economic miracle" was restoring German prosperity, the old aristocracy was defunct,  and middle-class philanthropy started to return to importance.

War and postwar: Belgium and Eastern Europe

The Commission for Relief in Belgium (CRB) was an international (predominantly American) organization that arranged for the supply of food to German-occupied Belgium and northern France during the First World War.  It was led by Herbert Hoover. Between 1914 and 1919, the CRB operated entirely with voluntary efforts and was able to feed 11,000,000 Belgians by raising the necessary money, obtaining voluntary contributions of money and food, shipping the food to Belgium and controlling it there. For example, the CRB shipped 697,116,000 pounds of flour to Belgium.   Biographer George Nash finds that by the end of 1916, Hoover "stood preeminent in the greatest humanitarian undertaking the world had ever seen."  Biographer William Leuchtenburg adds, "He had raised and spent millions of dollars, with trifling overhead and not a penny lost to fraud. At its peak, his organization was feeding nine million Belgians and French a day.

When the war ended in late 1918, Hoover took control of the American Relief Administration (ARA), with the mission of food to Central and Eastern Europe. The ARA fed millions. U.S. government funding for the ARA expired in the summer of 1919, and Hoover transformed the ARA into a private organization, raising millions of dollars from private donors. Under the auspices of the ARA, the European Children's Fund fed millions of starving children.  When attacked for distributing food to Russia, which was under Bolshevik control, Hoover snapped,  "Twenty million people are starving. Whatever their politics, they shall be fed!"

United States 

The first corporation founded in the Thirteen Colonies was Harvard College (1636), designed primarily to train young men for the clergy.  A leading theorist was the Puritan theologian Cotton Mather (1662–1728), who in 1710 published a widely read essay, Bonifacius, or an Essay to Do Good. Mather worried that the original idealism had eroded, so he advocated philanthropic benefaction as a way of life. Though his context was Christian, his idea was also characteristically American and explicitly Classical, on the threshold of the Enlightenment.

Benjamin Franklin (1706–1790) was an activist and theorist of American philanthropy. He was much influenced by Daniel Defoe's An Essay upon Projects (1697) and Cotton Mather's Bonifacius: an essay upon the good. (1710). Franklin attempted to motivate his fellow Philadelphians into projects for the betterment of the city: examples included the Library Company of Philadelphia (the first American subscription library), the fire department, the police force, street lighting and a hospital. A world-class physicist himself, he promoted scientific organizations including the Philadelphia Academy (1751) – which became the University of Pennsylvania – as well as the American Philosophical Society (1743), to enable scientific researchers from all 13 colonies to communicate.

By the 1820s, newly rich American businessmen were initiating philanthropic work, especially with respect to private colleges and hospitals. George Peabody (1795–1869) is the acknowledged father of modern philanthropy. A financier based in Baltimore and London, in the 1860s he began to endow libraries and museums in the United States, and also funded housing for poor people in London. His activities became the model for Andrew Carnegie and many others.

Andrew Carnegie

Andrew Carnegie (1835–1919) was the most influential leader of philanthropy on a national (rather than local) scale. After selling his steel company in 1901 he devoted himself to establishing philanthropic organizations, and making direct contributions to many educational, cultural and research institutions. He financed over 2500 public libraries built across the nation and abroad. He also funded Carnegie Hall in New York City and the Peace Palace in the Netherlands. 
His final and largest project was the Carnegie Corporation of New York, founded in 1911 with a $25 million endowment, later enlarged to $135 million. Carnegie Corporation has endowed or otherwise helped to establish institutions that include the Russian Research Center at Harvard University (now known as the Davis Center for Russian and Eurasian Studies), the Brookings Institution and the Sesame Workshop. In all, Andrew Carnegie gave away 90% of his fortune.

John D. Rockefeller

Other prominent American philanthropists of the early 20th century included John D. Rockefeller (1839–1937), Julius Rosenwald (1862–1932) and Margaret Olivia Slocum Sage (1828–1918). Rockefeller retired from business in the 1890s; he and his son John D. Rockefeller Jr. (1874–1960) made large-scale national philanthropy systematic, especially with regard to the study and application of modern medicine, higher education and scientific research. Of the $530 million the elder Rockefeller gave away, $450 million went to medicine. Their leading advisor Frederick Taylor Gates launched several very large philanthropic projects staffed by experts who sought to address problems systematically at the roots rather than let the recipients deal only with their immediate concerns.

By 1920, the Rockefeller Foundation was opening offices in Europe. It launched medical and scientific projects in Britain, France, Germany, Spain, and elsewhere. It supported the health projects of the League of Nations. By the 1950s, it was investing heavily in the Green Revolution, especially the work by Norman Borlaug that enabled India, Mexico and many poor countries to dramatically upgrade their agricultural productivity.

Ford Foundation

With the acquisition of most of the stock of the Ford Motor Company in the late 1940s, the Ford Foundation became the largest American philanthropy, splitting its activities between the United States, and the rest of the world. Outside the United States, it established a network of human rights organizations, promoted democracy, gave large numbers of fellowships for young leaders to study in the United States, and invested heavily in the Green Revolution, whereby poor nations dramatically increased their output of rice, wheat and other foods. Both Ford and Rockefeller were heavily involved. Ford also gave heavily to build up research universities in Europe and worldwide. For example, in Italy in 1950, it sent a team to help the Italian ministry of education reform the nation's school system, based on the principles of 'meritocracy" (rather than political or family patronage),  democratisation (with universal access to secondary schools). It reached a compromise between the Christian Democrats and the Socialists, to help promote uniform treatment and equal outcomes. The success in Italy became a model for Ford programs and many other nations.

The Ford Foundation in the 1950s wanted to modernize the legal systems in India and Africa, by promoting the American model. The plan failed, because of India's unique legal history, traditions, and profession, as well as its economic and political conditions. Ford, therefore, turned to agricultural reform. The success rate in Africa was no better, and that program closed in 1977.

Asia 

While charity has a long history in Asia, philanthropy or a systematic approach to doing good remains nascent. Chinese philosopher Mozi (c. 470 – c. 391 BC) developed the concept of "universal love" (jiān'ài, 兼愛), a reaction against perceived over-attachment to family and clan structures within Confucianism. Other interpretations of Confucianism see concern for others as an extension of benevolence.

Muslims in countries such as Indonesia are bound by zakat (almsgiving), while Buddhists and Christians throughout Asia may participate in philanthropic activities. In India, corporate social responsibility (CSR) is now mandated, with 2% of net profits to be directed towards charity.

Asia is home to the majority of the world's billionaires, surpassing the United States and Europe in 2017. Wikipedia's list of countries by number of billionaires shows three Asian economies in the top ten: 698 in China, 237 in India and 71 in Hong Kong (as of March 2021).

Whilst the region's philanthropy practices are relatively under-researched compared to those of the United States and Europe, the Centre for Asian Philanthropy and Society (CAPS) produces a study of the sector every two years. In 2020, its research found that if Asia were to donate the equivalent of two per cent of its GDP, the same as the United States, it would unleash US$507 billion (HK$3.9 trillion) annually, more than 11 times the foreign aid flowing into the region every year and one-third of the annual amount needed globally to meet the sustainable development goals by 2030.

Oceania

Australia 
Structured giving in Australia through foundations is slowly growing, although public data on the philanthropic sector is sparse.  There is no public registry of philanthropic foundations as distinct from charities more generally.

Two foundation types for which some data is available are Private Ancillary Funds (PAFs) and Public Ancillary Funds (PubAFs). Private Ancillary Funds have some similarities to private family foundations in the US and Europe, and do not have a public fundraising requirement.  Public Ancillary Funds include community foundations, some corporate foundations, and foundations that solely support single organisations such as hospitals, schools, museums and art galleries.  They must raise funds from the general public.

Differences between traditional and new philanthropy

Impact investment versus traditional philanthropy 
Traditional philanthropy and impact investment can be distinguished by how they serve society. Traditional philanthropy is usually short-term, where organizations obtain resources for causes through fund-raising and one-off donations. The Rockefeller Foundation and the Ford Foundation are examples of such; they focus more on the financial contributions to social causes and less on the actual actions and processes of benevolence. Impact investment, on the other hand, focuses on the interaction between individual wellbeing and broader society through the promotion of sustainability. Stressing the importance of impact and change, they invest in different sectors of society, including housing, infrastructure, healthcare and energy.

A suggested explanation for the preference for impact investment philanthropy to traditional philanthropy is the gaining prominence of the Sustainable Development Goals (SDGs) since 2015. Almost every SDG is linked to environmental protection and sustainability because of raising concerns about how globalisation, liberal consumerism and population growth may affect the environment. As a result, development agencies have seen increased accountability on their part, as they face greater pressure to fit with current developmental agendas.

Traditional philanthropy versus philanthrocapitalism 
Philanthrocapitalism differs from traditional philanthropy in how it operates. Traditional philanthropy is about charity, mercy, and selfless devotion improving recipients' wellbeing. Philanthrocapitalism, is philanthropy transformed by business and the market, where profit-oriented business models are designed that work for the good of humanity. Share value companies are an example. They help develop and deliver curricula in education, strengthen their own businesses and improve the job prospects of people. Firms improve social outcomes, but while they do so, they also benefit themselves.

The rise of philanthrocapitalism can be attributed to global capitalism. There is an understanding that philanthropy is not worthwhile if no economic benefit can be derived by philanthropy organisations, both from a social and private perspective. Therefore, philanthropy has been seen as a tool to sustain economic growth and the firm's own growth, based on human capital theory. Through education, specific skills are taught which enhance people's capacity to learn and their productivity at work.

Intel invests in science, technology, engineering, and mathematics (STEM) curricular standards in the US and provides learning resources and materials for schools, for its own innovation and revenue. The New Employment Opportunities initiative in Latin America is a regional collaboration to train 1 million youth by 2022 to raise employment standards and ultimately provide a talented pool of labour for companies.

Celebrity philanthropy
Celebrity philanthropy refers to celebrity-affiliated charitable and philanthropic activities. It is an increasingly prevalent topic of scholarship in studies of 'the popular' vis-à-vis the modern and post-modern world. Structured and systematised charitable giving by celebrities is a relatively new phenomenon. Although charity and fame are associated historically, it was only in the 1990s that entertainment and sports celebrities from affluent western societies became involved with a particular type of philanthropy. Celebrity philanthropy in contemporary western societies is not isolated to large one-off monetary donations by definition. It involves celebrities using their publicity, brand credibility and personal wealth to promote not-for-profit organisations, which are increasingly 'business-like' in form. This is sometimes termed as 'celanthropy' – the fusion of celebrity and cause as a representation of what the organisation advocates.

Implications on government and governance
The advent of celebrity philanthropy has seen the contraction of government involvement in areas such as welfare support and foreign aid to name a few. This can be identified from the proliferation of neoliberal policies. Conversely, public interest groups, not-for-profit organisations and the United Nations now budget extensive amounts of time and money to use celebrity endorsers in their campaigns. An example of this is the People's Climate March, which took place on 21 September 2014. The demonstration was part of the larger People's Climate Movement, which aims to raise awareness of climate change and environmental issues more generally. Notable celebrities who are part of this campaign include actors Leonardo DiCaprio, Mark Ruffalo and Edward Norton.

Examples
The Concert for Bangladesh
Band Aid
LiveAid
NetAid
Danny Thomas and St. Jude Children's Research Hospital
Geena Davis Institute on Gender in Media
Jerry Lewis and the MDA Telethon
List of UNICEF Goodwill Ambassadors
Newman's Own
Tiger Woods Foundation
Richard Gere Activism
Remote Area Medical
Beyond the Crisis

Philanthropic capitalism 
Philanthropic capitalism or Philanthrocapitalism is a way of doing philanthropy through the capitalist realm.  Instead of it being for profit, the philanthropist does it as a non-profit and only breaks even or even takes a small loss, but the overall gain to the community would be greater than the small loss they in-cured.  For example, if a philanthropist puts up $10 million dollars for neighborhood revitalization to build new homes in place of dilapidated housing and only breaks even or takes on a small loss selling the homes. If they took a $1,000 loss on each home, 10,000 homes could be made with that initial philanthropic donation.  It could be run like a nonprofit organization so they wouldn't have to pay property taxes on the homes as they were waiting to be sold.

Criticism 
Despite the initial observed benefits of philanthropy as a variant form of charity, it has been noted that philanthropy has been used by ultra high-net-worth individuals to offset their larger tax liabilities, through charitable contribution deductions enabled by the tax code. In the book Winners Take All: The Elite Charade of Changing the World by Anand Giridharadas, he notes that various philanthropic initiatives by the wealthy elite in practice function to entrench the power structures and special interests of the wealthy elite. For example, despite Robert F. Smith's generosity by paying off the student debt incurred by the Morehouse class of 2019, he simultaneously fought against changes to the tax code that would have made more money available to help low-income students pay for college. As a result, Giridharadas argues, Smith's philanthropic giving functions to reinforce the prevailing status quo and perpetuates income inequality, instead of addressing the root cause of social issues.

The ability of wealthy people to deduct a significant amount of their tax liabilities in the form of philanthropic giving, as noted by the late German billionaire shipping magnate and philanthropist Peter Kramer, functioned as "a bad transfer of power", from democratically elected politicians to unelected billionaires, whereby it is no longer "the state that determines what is good for the people, but rather the rich who decide". The Global Policy Forum, an independent policy watchdog which functions to monitor the activities of the United Nations General Assembly, warned governments and international organisations that they should "assess the growing influence of major philanthropic foundations, and especially the Bill & Melinda Gates Foundation … and analyse the intended and unintended risks and side-effects of their activities" prior to accepting money from rich donors. In 2015, Global Policy Forum also warned elected politicians that they should be particularly concerned about "the unpredictable and insufficient financing of public goods, the lack of monitoring and accountability mechanisms, and the prevailing practice of applying business logic to the provision of public goods".

Giridharadas also argues that philanthrophy also functions to distract the general public from some of the ill-gotten gains that were derived for profit from the marketplace. For example, the Sackler family were known for their generous philanthropic giving to various cultural institutions worldwide. However, their philanthropic giving functioned as deception and propaganda, as their legacy of generosity was tainted by the subsequent exposure of Purdue Pharma's role in encouraging and exacerbating the opioid epidemic. As a result of their exposed ill-gotten gains from the social issues caused by the philanthropic donors, the British institutions of the National Portrait Gallery, London and the Tate, along with the American institution Solomon R. Guggenheim Museum, announced their rejection of charitable giving from the Sackler family trusts.

See also 
 List of philanthropists
 List of wealthiest charitable foundations
 Charitable organization
 Ethics of philanthropy
Effective altruism
 Foundation (charity)
 Non-profit organization
 Venture philanthropy
 Visiting the sick
 Misanthropy
 Philanthropic capitalism

References

Further reading
 Adam, Thomas. Philanthropy, Patronage, and Civil Society: Experiences from Germany, Great Britain, and North America (2008)
 Burlingame, D.F. Ed. (2004). Philanthropy in America: A comprehensive historical encyclopaedia (3 vol. ABC Clio).
 Curti, Merle E. American philanthropy abroad: a history (Rutgers UP, 1963).
 
 Grimm, Robert T. Notable American Philanthropists: Biographies of Giving and Volunteering (2002)  excerpt
 Hitchcock, William I. (2014) "World War I and the humanitarian impulse." The Tocqueville Review/La revue Tocqueville 35.2 (2014): 145–163.
 Ilchman, Warren F. et al. Philanthropy in the World's Traditions  (1998) Examines philanthropy in Buddhist, Islamic, Hindu, Jewish, and Native American religious traditions and in cultures from Latin America, Eastern Europe, the Middle East, Africa, and Asia. online
 Jordan, W.K. Philanthropy in England, 1480–1660: A Study of the Changing Pattern of English Social Aspirations (1959)  online
 Kiger, Joseph C.  Philanthropists and foundation globalization (Transaction Publishers, 2011).
 Petersen, Jørn Henrik, Klaus Petersen, and Søren Kolstrup. "Autonomy, Cooperation or Colonization? Christian Philanthropy and State Welfare in Denmark." Journal of Church and State 56#1 (2014): 81–104.
 Reich, Rob, Chiara Cordelli, and Lucy Bernholz, eds. Philanthropy in democratic societies: History, institutions, values (U of Chicago Press, 2016).
 Zunz, Olivier. Philanthropy in America: A history (Princeton UP, 2014).

External links

 History of Philanthropy, 1601–present compiled and edited by National Philanthropic Trust